William Louis Reed (April 5, 1866 - ?) served in the Massachusetts House of Representatives. He succeeded Robert Teamoh in 1896. He was a Republican representing parts of Boston. He was born in Danville, Virginia. He attended Stoneham High School and Bryant & Stratton College.

See also
 1896 Massachusetts legislature
 1897 Massachusetts legislature

References

1866 births
Bryant and Stratton College alumni
Republican Party members of the Massachusetts House of Representatives
Politicians from Danville, Virginia
Politicians from Boston
Year of death missing